The Casper Federal Building, at 111 South Wolcott Street in Casper, Wyoming, was built in 1932.  It is now known as the Ewing T. Kerr Federal Building and U.S. Courthouse.  It was listed on the National Register of Historic Places in 1998.

It is a Classical Revival-style building designed by architect James A. Wetmore.

It is a three-story -plan building built of reinforced concrete and brick tiles, faced with red pressed brick and sandstone.  It has a hipped roof of slate tiles.

References

External links

Federal buildings in the United States
Courthouses in Wyoming
National Register of Historic Places in Natrona County, Wyoming
Neoclassical architecture in Wyoming
Government buildings completed in 1932